Huaqiangbei is a subdistrict of Futian, Shenzhen, Guangdong Province, China, one of Shenzhen's notable retail areas, having one of the largest electronics markets in the world. The area's status as a major electronics manufacturing hub, and sprawling electronics marketplaces have earned it (and Shenzhen) occidental nicknames such as "China's Silicon Valley", and the "Silicon Valley of Hardware". Multiple malls contain various businesses. 

In 2018, due to slowing demand for smartphones, some shops are now selling cosmetics. In 2020 the area had about 38,000 businesses. Its known in China for selling cheap electronics. Most of the smartphones in China are from here.

Location

It is at the spine of a shopping district, with cross streets Zhenzhong Road, Zhenhua Road and Zhenxing Road. Huafa Road is immediately parallel to the east with Yannan Road further away. The central area of the district is along Huaqiang Road, a busy pedestrian street which the district is named after.

Locale 

The area is characterized by tree-lined streets with wide footpaths. 
There are three Shenzhen Metro stations in the area: 
Huaqiang Road station on Line 1
Huaqiang North station on Line 2 and Line 7
Huaxin station on Line 3 and Line 7

Gallery

References

External links 
 Shenzhen: The Silicon Valley of Hardware, Youtube: a documentary focused on Huaqiangbei.

Futian District
Electronics districts
Subdistricts of Shenzhen
Shopping districts and streets in China
Business districts